Shakespeare in Original Pronunciation (OP) is a movement dedicated to the examination and subsequent performance of Shakespeare's works in the phonology, or sound system, of Early Modern English.

Modern movement
In 2004, Shakespeare's Globe, in London, produced three performances of Romeo and Juliet in original pronunciation. Spearheaded by linguist David Crystal and play director, Tim Carroll, this was the beginning of contemporary interest in Shakespeare in original pronunciation.

In 2005, the Globe went on to produce six performances of Troilus and Cressida in original pronunciation. Since then, there have been many further productions of Shakespeare in original pronunciation, including A Midsummer Night's Dream in 2010 by the University of Kansas and Twelfth Night in 2012 by the American Theatre of Actors.

In April 2013, Bangor University's ROSTRA performed As You Like It in original pronunciation under the supervision of David Crystal.

Motivations
Shakespeare's Early Modern English was a time of great linguistic change for the English language. One change that was then taking place was the Great Vowel Shift, which changed the pronunciation of long vowels. Many words of Early Modern English were pronounced differently from today's standard pronunciation of Modern English.

According to linguist David Crystal, Shakespeare in Original Pronunciation is "Shakespeare as hopefully he would have heard it.... It sounds raw and from the heart, which is very different from the way I think Shakespeare has been performed for the last half century or so."

Also, audiences hearing Shakespeare in contemporary pronunciation often miss hearing rhymes and puns that worked well in Early Modern English.

On the other hand, Laura Lodewyck, Assistant Professor of Theatre at North Central College, comments that "there are limits to the OP enterprise. Some texts, for instance, may be better suited to OP performance than others."

Examples

Pun
An example of a Shakespearean pun that no longer works in Modern English comes from the prologue of Romeo and Juliet, Act 1, lines 5-6:

From forth the fatal loins of these two foes A pair of star-crossed lovers take their life

Thus, Modern English audiences miss the pun.

Another example is the pronunciation of "hour", as in As You Like It:
And so from hour to hour we ripe and ripe. And then from hour to hour we rot and rot. And thereby hangs a tale.

In Early Modern English, "hour" was pronounced , homophonous to "whore"; H-dropping was regularly observed. The change in pronunciation of both words in Modern English means that a sexual joke is missed by a modern audience.

Rhyme
An example of a Shakespearean rhyme that no longer works in Modern English comes from A Midsummer Night's Dream, Act 3, Scene II, lines 104-106:

Flower of this purple dye,  Hit with Cupid's archery,  Sink in apple of his eye.

Reactions
The audience reaction to Shakespeare in Original Pronunciation varies.

Laura Lodewyck cites a New York Times review of the 2005 production of Troilus and Cressida in which the reviewer states: 

Alternatively, David Crystal writes that audience members often connect to the performance through the pronunciation and comments: "We speak like that where we come from." However, as Lodewyck also notes, as a leading expert in that area of study, Crystal has reasons to be biased toward such productions.

Original Pronunciation can also have an effect on the actors involved.

Ben Crystal, a Shakespearean actor and son of David Crystal, comments on the way Shakespeare in original pronunciation affects his body and vocal register: 

Although the beginning of the Globe's foray into Original Pronunciation showed that older actors had more difficulty in embracing it, successful performances eventually occurred.

References

External links 
 David Crystal's website on original pronunciation
 Paul Meier's transcript of A Midsummer Night's Dream in original pronunciation with David Crystal's recording
 The Oxford Dictionary of Original Shakespearean Pronunciation by David Crystal
 Shakespeare's Original Pronunciation CD by Ben Crystal

Stage productions of plays by William Shakespeare